Member of the Government is a 1939 Soviet drama film directed by Iosif Kheifits and Aleksandr Zarkhi.

Plot 
Aleksandra  Sokolova, the wife of a peasant and a former farm laborer who becomes a deputy of the Supreme Soviet of the Soviet Union, overcoming collectivization problems and difficulties in her personal life.

Starring 
 Vera Maretskaya as Aleksandra Grigoryevna Sokolova 
 Vasili Vanin as Yefim Yefimovich Sokolov  
 Nikolay Kryuchkov as Nikita Sokolov, blond brother-in-law  
 Ivan Nazarov as Fedot Petrovich Krivosheyev
 Valentina Telegina as Panya, fat woman  
 Boris Blinov as The District Party Secretary
 Vasili Merkuryev as Party Undersecretary Stashkov
 Aleksey Konsovsky as Petka, teen groom
 Aleksandra Matveeva as Duska, teen bride  
 Konstantin Sorokin as Kuzma, beefy kolkhoz rowdy  
 Yelizaveta Uvarova as Duska's mother
 Aleksandr Melnikov as Escort (uncredited)

Awards and nominations
 New York Film Critics Circle Awards — Best Foreign Language Film (nom)

References

External links 

1939 films
1930s Russian-language films
Soviet drama films
1939 drama films
Lenfilm films
Soviet black-and-white films
Films directed by Aleksandr Zarkhi
Films directed by Iosif Kheifits